The inshore lizardfish (Synodus foetens) is a member of the family Synodontidae found in the western Atlantic.

Description

The inshore lizardfish has a maximum length recorded of about 50 cm but generally we see them at about 40 cm long. Their lifespan can be up to nine years. The body of this species is elongated, similar to a cigar. The maximum weight has been seen as 900 g. Females are generally larger than males when mature. The shape of the mouth of this species is large and pointed. The snout is pointed.  The top jaw extends beyond the eye. Many  slender teeth are present in the roof of the mouth and jaws. The lateral line is considered to be well marked. The lateral line encompasses around 60 scales along the length. The inshore lizardfish has no dorsal spines, 10-13 dorsal soft rays, no anal spines, 11-13 anal soft rays, and 56-62 vertebrae.  The color of the dorsal side of the lizardfish ranges from various shades of brown to olive. The belly side ranges from white to yellow. Juveniles have dark spots, these spots are reduced/absent in adults. The sides of the inshore lizardfish have patches that are diamond-shaped. These patches vary in occurrence and intensity, they usually fade with growth and usually occur at the midlateral line on the fish. The dorsal fin is on the center of the back. An adipose fin is present in this species, usually showing a darker spot. The adipose fin is small in size with the base of the fin being no longer than the diameter of the pupil. The anal fin is usually equal in length or longer than the dorsal fin.

Diet 

The inshore lizardfish is an ambush predator. Its diet consists of various fish and small invertebrates. They include: shrimp, crabs, and cephalopods.

Habitat 

The habitats for these fish include the bottom in shallow inshore marine waters, usually over sand or mud bottoms, including creeks, rivers, among seagrasses, estuaries, bays, and lagoons. Adults have been found to be also in the open sea above continental shelves.

Reproduction and lifecycle 

Fertilization has been observed to be external. They spawn all throughout the year. They do not guard their spherical-shaped eggs because the eggs are scattered in the water; they fall into plants and rocks.

Distribution 

The inshore lizardfish is widely distributed. This fish can be found over soft-bottom inshore areas, especially in the northern Gulf of Mexico described as  "in the western Atlantic from New Jersey south along the U.S. coast, Bermuda, the Bahamas, and in the Caribbean from Cuba, Jamaica, Puerto Rico, and St. Martin" (2015).

Importance to humans 

This species is often captured during shrimp trawls. This occurs in the northern Gulf of Mexico. High mortality occurs from trawl bycatch for this species, but they are usually just discarded after being caught because they have little to no commercial value.

Etymology 

The generic name Synodus is from the Greek syn, meaning grown together, and odus meaning teeth.

References

External links

 

inshore lizardfish
Fish of the Eastern United States
Fish of the Western Atlantic
inshore lizardfish
Taxa named by Carl Linnaeus